The Little High Rock Canyon Wilderness is a US Wilderness Area in Nevada under the Bureau of Land Management. It is located south of the High Rock Canyon Wilderness and west of the High Rock Lake Wilderness.

History
In the winter of 1911, Mike Daggett and his band were camped at Little High Rock Canyon where they ran low on food and killed some cattle.  Laster, Daggett and his band killed a cattleman and three sheepmen who had gone to investigate the missing cattle.  Daggett and his band were pursued to Kelley Creek, near Winnemucca where the Battle of Kelley Creek occurred.  Daggett and seven of his band were killed along with a posse member.  Only four children of the band survived the battle.

In 2005, a plaque describing the events of 1911 was placed at Little High Rock Canyon.

See also 
Black Rock Desert-High Rock Canyon Emigrant Trails National Conservation Area

References

External links 
Little High Rock Canyon Wilderness page at Wilderness.net

Wilderness areas of Nevada
Protected areas of Washoe County, Nevada
Protected areas of Humboldt County, Nevada
IUCN Category Ib
Bureau of Land Management areas in Nevada
Protected areas established in 2000
2000 establishments in Nevada